Cybaris is a biannual law review published by Mitchell Hamline School of Law. It was established in 2010 and focuses on intellectual property law. Cybaris was featured in an article published by Patently-O. The founding editors-in-chief were Jennell Bilek and Ryan C. Smith (2010). The current editor-in-chief is Molly R. Littman.

Cybaris has its own searchable database in Westlaw (CYBARIS), and is included Westlaw's index of law reviews (TP-ALL).

See also 
 List of intellectual property law journals
 William Mitchell College of Law
 Mitchell Hamline School of Law

References

External links 
 

Intellectual property law journals
English-language journals
American law journals
Law journals edited by students
Publications established in 2010
Biannual journals
Mitchell Hamline School of Law